Orfeas Eleftheroupoli Football Club is a Greek football club, based in Eleftheroupoli, Kavala.

The club was founded in 1925. They will play for 2nd year in Football League 2 for the season 2014-15

External links
 https://web.archive.org/web/20141222093142/http://www.orfeasfc.gr/

Football clubs in Eastern Macedonia and Thrace
Kavala (regional unit)